Reno is a city in Lamar County, Texas, United States. The population was 3,166 at the 2010 census, and 3,454 in 2020.

History 
Reno, on U.S. Highway 82 adjacent to Paris in Lamar County, may have been a switching station on the Texas and Pacific Railway, which was built through the area in 1876. In 1886 the community had two schools, one for whites and one for blacks. The town at one time may have been named Davis, or the names Davis and Reno may have been used concurrently, since records from 1886 to 1887 show a post office called Davis at Reno Switch, and records from 1890 to 1891 still have a Davis post office, by then at Reno. Reno had a general store and a grocery store in 1891. Its post office was discontinued in 1907. By 1942 it had four businesses and a population of eighty, and by 1948 it still had two schools in operation. Reno incorporated in 1968, and by 1969 its population was 180.

Geography

Reno is located at  (33.669621, –95.472084).

Demographics

As of the 2020 United States census, there were 3,454 people, 1,390 households, and 1,106 families residing in the city. As of the census of 2000, there were 2,767 people, 1,041 households, and 835 families residing in the city. The population density was 731.1 people per square mile (282.6/km). There were 1,089 housing units at an average density of 287.8/sq mi (111.2/km). The racial makeup of the city was 93.46% White, 2.82% African American, 1.45% Native American, 0.40% Asian, 0.69% from other races, and 1.19% from two or more races. Hispanic or Latino of any race were 2.20% of the population.

There were 1,041 households, out of which 43.3% had children under the age of 18 living with them, 66.3% were married couples living together, 11.7% had a female householder with no husband present, and 19.7% were non-families. 17.9% of all households were made up of individuals, and 5.3% had someone living alone who was 65 years of age or older. The average household size was 2.66 and the average family size was 3.01.

In the city, the population was spread out, with 29.5% under the age of 18, 8.0% from 18 to 24, 30.1% from 25 to 44, 22.9% from 45 to 64, and 9.4% who were 65 years of age or older. The median age was 34 years. For every 100 females, there were 93.1 males. For every 100 females age 18 and over, there were 89.1 males.

The median income for a household in the city was $40,893, and the median income for a family was $45,000. Males had a median income of $38,889 versus $22,238 for females. The per capita income for the city was $20,403. About 5.7% of families and 6.9% of the population were below the poverty line, including 8.4% of those under age 18 and 7.9% of those age 65 or over.

Education
The city of Reno is served by the North Lamar Independent School District.

References

External links
 City of Reno – Official site
 Reno, Texas Businesses

Cities in Lamar County, Texas
Cities in Texas